Prince Mikhail Mikhailovitch Golitsyn or  Galitzin ( (1 November 1684 – 25 March 1764) was a Russian admiral and diplomat.

Biography

Born in Moscow, he was the youngest son of Mikhail Andreyevich Golitsyn and his wife Prascovia Nikitichna Kaftyriova. 

In 1703 he began a career in the Imperial Russian Navy. From 1708 to 1717 he studied seamanship in the Netherlands and the United Kingdom. In 1717 he returned to Russia and participated in the Great Northern War, during which he distinguished himself in the Battle of Grengam, commanding a detachment of rowing fleet that defeated a Swedish squadron.

In 1726 he became an advisor to the Board of Admiralty and was made a Lieutenant commander. In 1728 he became privy councilor and senator, and in 1727 he was named president of the College of Justice. Together with his brother, also Mikhail Mikhailovitch, he participated in the events surrounding the coronation of Empress Anna Ivanovna.

In 1732 he returned to the navy with the rank of vice admiral but in 1741 Empress Elizabeth came to the throne and he was recalled to politics, again becoming a privy councilor in 1745. He was appointed ambassador to Persia from 1745 to 1748, and brought peach trees back to his greenhouse, resulting in the first crop of peaches harvested in Russia.

In 1746 he was promoted to the rank of admiral, from 1748 he was commander of the Russian Navy, and in 1750 he was appointed Chairman of the Board of Admiralty. He is one of the admirals credited for the development of the Russian art of naval warfare. In December 1752, he was appointed supreme commander of Saint Petersburg, a post he held until May 1754.

In 1756, Golitsyn was elevated to the rank of admiral-general, He was the third person to hold this position, and the last one who was not a member of the royal family.

He retired in 1762 and died on 25 March 1764 in Moscow. He was buried there in the Epiphany Monastery.

Marriages

First marriage
His first wife was Maria Dmitrievna Golovina (d. 1721). They had no children.

Second marriage

On January 22, 1722, he married Tatiana Kirillovna Naryshkyna (1704–1757), daughter of the governor of Moscow, Kirill Alekseyevich Naryshkin.  They had eight children: 
 Alexandr Mikhailovich (1723–1807)
 Ekaterina Mikhailovna (1725–1744)
 Sergei Mikhailovich (1727–1806)
 Anastasia Mikhailovna (1728–1779)
 Elizaveta Mikhailovna (1730–1795)
 Mikhail Mikhailovich (1731–1804)
 Dmitry Mikhailovich (1735–1771)
 Pyotr Mikhailovich (1738–1775)

References 

Imperial Russian Navy admirals
1684 births
1764 deaths
Diplomats from Moscow
Mikhail Mikhailovich
17th-century Russian military personnel
18th-century military personnel from the Russian Empire
Politicians of the Russian Empire
Members of the Supreme Privy Council
Active Privy Councillor (Russian Empire)
Ambassadors of the Russian Empire to Iran
Russian princes
Military personnel from Moscow